The Karuizawa International Curling Championships is a curling bonspiel held annually since the Olympic Games in Nagano at the SCAP Karuizawa Arena in Kariuzawa, Japan. The bonspiel is held to commemorate the curling event at the 1998 Nagano Olympics, the first official curling event in the Olympic programme since the 1924 Winter Olympics. It is also held to help promote curling throughout Japan. The event became a World Curling Tour event in 2014.

Format

Current format
A total of 24 teams (12 men's and 12 women's teams) are invited each year to participate in the championship. The teams play a two-pool round robin tournament with games of eight ends, and the top six teams of each gender play eight-end games in the final round.

Previous format
Prior to 2013, a total of 16 teams (8 men's and 8 women's teams) were invited each year to participate in the championship. Five teams of each gender were chosen from foreign nations based on performances at the most recent World Curling Championships, while three teams were chosen from within Japan. The teams were chosen as follows:

The eight teams of each gender played a round robin tournament with games of eight ends, and the top four teams of each gender played ten-end games in the final round.

Champions (1999-2009)

Past Champions (since 2010)

Notes

References

External links
Karuizawa CC Homepage
Official website

Sport in Nagano Prefecture
Curling
Curling competitions in Japan